Irish embassy may refer to:

 List of diplomatic missions of Ireland
 List of diplomatic missions in Ireland